In mathematics, an open set is a generalization of an open interval in the real line.

More generally, an open set is a member of a given collection of subsets of a given set, a collection that has the property of containing every union of its members, every finite intersection of its members, the empty set, and the whole set itself. A set in which such a collection is given is called a topological space, and the collection is called a topology. These conditions are very loose, and allow enormous flexibility in the choice of open sets. For example, every subset can be open (the discrete topology), or no subset can be open except the space itself and the empty set (the indiscrete topology).

In practice, however, open sets are usually chosen to provide a notion of nearness that is similar to that of metric spaces, without having a notion of distance defined. In particular, a topology allows defining properties such as continuity, connectedness, and compactness, which were originally defined by means of a distance.

The most common case of a topology without any distance is given by manifolds, which are topological spaces that, near each point, resemble an open set of a Euclidean space, but on which no distance is defined in general. Less intuitive topologies are used in other branches of mathematics; for example, the Zariski topology, which is fundamental in algebraic geometry and scheme theory.

Motivation 
Intuitively, an open set provides a method to distinguish two points. For example, if about one of two points in a topological space, there exists an open set not containing the other (distinct) point, the two points are referred to as topologically distinguishable. In this manner, one may speak of whether two points, or more generally two subsets, of a topological space are "near" without concretely defining a distance. Therefore, topological spaces may be seen as a generalization of spaces equipped with a notion of distance, which are called metric spaces.

In the set of all real numbers, one has the natural Euclidean metric; that is, a function which measures the distance between two real numbers: . Therefore, given a real number x, one can speak of the set of all points close to that real number; that is, within ε of x. In essence, points within ε of x approximate x to an accuracy of degree ε. Note that ε > 0 always but as ε becomes smaller and smaller, one obtains points that approximate x to a higher and higher degree of accuracy. For example, if x = 0 and ε = 1, the points within ε of x are precisely the points of the interval (−1, 1); that is, the set of all real numbers between −1 and 1. However, with ε = 0.5, the points within ε of x are precisely the points of (−0.5, 0.5). Clearly, these points approximate x to a greater degree of accuracy than when ε = 1.

The previous discussion shows, for the case x = 0, that one may approximate x to higher and higher degrees of accuracy by defining ε to be smaller and smaller. In particular, sets of the form (−ε, ε) give us a lot of information about points close to x = 0. Thus, rather than speaking of a concrete Euclidean metric, one may use sets to describe points close to x. This innovative idea has far-reaching consequences; in particular, by defining different collections of sets containing 0 (distinct from the sets (−ε, ε)), one may find different results regarding the distance between 0 and other real numbers. For example, if we were to define R as the only such set for "measuring distance", all points are close to 0 since there is only one possible degree of accuracy one may achieve in approximating 0: being a member of R. Thus, we find that in some sense, every real number is distance 0 away from 0. It may help in this case to think of the measure as being a binary condition: all things in R are equally close to 0, while any item that is not in R is not close to 0.

In general, one refers to the family of sets containing 0, used to approximate 0, as a neighborhood basis; a member of this neighborhood basis is referred to as an open set. In fact, one may generalize these notions to an arbitrary set (X); rather than just the real numbers. In this case, given a point (x) of that set, one may define a collection of sets "around" (that is, containing) x, used to approximate x. Of course, this collection would have to satisfy certain properties (known as axioms) for otherwise we may not have a well-defined method to measure distance. For example, every point in X should approximate x to some degree of accuracy. Thus X should be in this family. Once we begin to define "smaller" sets containing x, we tend to approximate x to a greater degree of accuracy. Bearing this in mind, one may define the remaining axioms that the family of sets about x is required to satisfy.

Definitions 
Several definitions are given here, in an increasing order of technicality. Each one is a special case of the next one.

Euclidean space 

Metric space 
A subset U of a metric space  is called open if, for any point x in U, there exists a real number ε > 0 such that any point  satisfying  belongs to U. Equivalently, U is open if every point in U has a neighborhood contained in U.

This generalizes the Euclidean space example, since Euclidean space with the Euclidean distance is a metric space.

Topological space 

 and 
Any union of sets in  belong to : if  then 
Any finite intersection of sets in  belong to : if  then 

Infinite intersections of open sets need not be open. For example, the intersection of all intervals of the form  where  is a positive integer, is the set  which is not open in the real line.

A metric space is a topological space, whose topology consists of the collection of all subsets that are unions of open balls. There are, however, topological spaces that are not metric spaces.

Special types of open sets

Clopen sets and non-open and/or non-closed sets 

A set might be open, closed, both, or neither. In particular, open and closed sets are not mutually exclusive, meaning that it is in general possible for a subset of a topological space to simultaneously be both an open subset  a closed subset.

In  topological space  the empty set  and the set  itself are always clopen. These two sets are the most well-known examples of clopen subsets and they show that clopen subsets exist in  topological space.

Consider the real line  endowed with its usual Euclidean topology, whose open sets are defined as follows: every interval  of real numbers belongs to the topology, every union of such intervals, e.g.  belongs to the topology, and as always, both  and  belong to the topology.

 The interval  is open in  because it belongs to the Euclidean topology. If  were to have an open complement, it would mean by definition that  were closed.
 By a similar argument, the interval  is a closed subset but not an open subset.
 Finally, since neither  nor its complement  belongs to the Euclidean topology (because it can not be written as a union of intervals of the form ), this means that  is neither open nor closed.

Regular open sets 

Every regular open set (resp. regular closed set) is an open subset (resp. is a closed subset) although in general, the converses are  true.

Properties 
The union of any number of open sets, or infinitely many open sets, is open. The intersection of a finite number of open sets is open.

A complement of an open set (relative to the space that the topology is defined on) is called a closed set. A set may be both open and closed (a clopen set). The empty set and the full space are examples of sets that are both open and closed.

Uses 

Open sets have a fundamental importance in topology. The concept is required to define and make sense of topological space and other topological structures that deal with the notions of closeness and convergence for spaces such as metric spaces and uniform spaces.

Every subset A of a topological space X contains a (possibly empty) open set; the maximum (ordered under inclusion) such open set is called the interior of A. 
It can be constructed by taking the union of all the open sets contained in A.

An open set on the real line has the characteristic property that it is a countable union of disjoint open intervals.

Notes and cautions

"Open" is defined relative to a particular topology 

Whether a set is open depends on the topology under consideration. Having opted for greater brevity over greater clarity, we refer to a set X endowed with a topology  as "the topological space X" rather than "the topological space ", despite the fact that all the topological data is contained in  If there are two topologies on the same set, a set U that is open in the first topology might fail to be open in the second topology. For example, if X is any topological space and Y is any subset of X, the set Y can be given its own topology (called the 'subspace topology') defined by "a set U is open in the subspace topology on Y if and only if U is the intersection of Y with an open set from the original topology on X." This potentially introduces new open sets: if V is open in the original topology on X, but  isn't open in the original topology on X, then  is open in the subspace topology on Y.

As a concrete example of this, if U is defined as the set of rational numbers in the interval  then U is an open subset of the rational numbers, but not of the real numbers. This is because when the surrounding space is the rational numbers, for every point x in U, there exists a positive number a such that all  points within distance a of x are also in U. On the other hand, when the surrounding space is the reals, then for every point x in U there is  positive a such that all  points within distance a of x are in U (because U contains no non-rational numbers).

Generalizations of open sets 

Throughout,  will be a topological space. 

A subset  of a topological space  is called:

 if , and the complement of such a set is called .
There exists an open (in ) subset  such that  is a dense subset of 
The complement of a preopen set is called . 
 if . The complement of a b-open set is called .
 or  if it satisfies any of the following equivalent conditions:
 is a regular closed subset of 
There exists a preopen subset  of  such that 
The complement of a β-open set is called . 
 if it satisfies any of the following equivalent conditions:
The complement of a sequentially open set is called .
 and is said to have  if there exists an open subset  such that  is a meager subset, where  denotes the symmetric difference.
 if .
 if for each  there exists some semiopen subset  of  such that 

Using the fact that 
 and 

whenever two subsets  satisfy  the following may be deduced:

 Every α-open subset is semi-open, semi-preopen, preopen, and b-open. 
 Every b-open set is semi-preopen (i.e. β-open). 
 Every preopen set is b-open and semi-preopen. 
 Every semi-open set is b-open and semi-preopen.

Moreover, a subset is a regular open set if and only if it is preopen and semi-closed. The intersection of an α-open set and a semi-preopen (resp. semi-open, preopen, b-open) set is a semi-preopen (resp. semi-open, preopen, b-open) set.  Preopen sets need not be semi-open and semi-open sets need not be preopen. 

Arbitrary unions of preopen (resp. α-open, b-open, semi-preopen) sets are once again preopen (resp. α-open, b-open, semi-preopen). However, finite intersections of preopen sets need not be preopen. The set of all α-open subsets of a space  forms a topology on  that is finer than  

A space  is totally disconnected if and only if every regular closed subset is preopen or equivalently, if every semi-open subset is preopen.

See also

Notes

References

Bibliography

External links 
 

General topology